Amatoxin is the collective name of a subgroup of at least nine related toxic compounds found in three genera of poisonous mushrooms (Amanita, Galerina and Lepiota) and one species (Conocybe filaris) of the genus Conocybe. Amatoxins are lethal in even small doses, as little as half a mushroom, including the immature "egg" form which appears quite different from the fully-grown mushroom.

Although laboratory analysis has found that the spores contain as little as 3% the toxin concentration of the main mushroom body, anecdotes have been repeated in field guides that claim foragers have fallen ill from spores alone after collecting but then discarding toxic Amanitas, unknowingly leaving their spore dust on the remaining harvest.  Unlike many ingested poisons, they cannot be destroyed by heat without destroying the mushrooms beyond edibility first, so cooking the poisonous mushrooms does not diminish their lethality.

Structure 

The compounds have a similar structure, that of eight amino-acid residues arranged in a conserved macrobicyclic motif (an overall pentacyclic structure when counting the rings inherent in the proline and tryptophan-derived residues); they were isolated in 1941 by Heinrich O. Wieland and Rudolf Hallermayer. All amatoxins are oligopeptides that are synthesized as 35-amino-acid proproteins, from which the final eight amino acids are cleaved by a prolyl oligopeptidase. The schematic amino acid sequence of amatoxins is Ile-Trp-Gly-Ile-Gly-Cys-Asn-Pro with cross-linking between Trp and Cys via the sulfoxide (S=O) moiety and hydroxylation in variants of the molecule; enzymes for these processings steps remain unknown.

There are currently ten named amatoxins:

δ-Amanitin has been reported, but its chemical structure has not been determined.

Family relations 

Amanitin is very closely related to phalloidins, which are bicyclic 7-residue toxins. They both belong to a "MSDIN" family, named after the highly conserved 5-amino-acid sequence in these presumed preproteins. A 2014 research study determined that there exists a significant number of uncharacterized MSDIN sequences that do not belong to either class in Amanita alone.

Mechanism
Amatoxins are potent and selective inhibitors of RNA polymerase II, a vital enzyme in the synthesis of messenger RNA (mRNA), microRNA, and small nuclear RNA (snRNA). Without mRNA, which is the template for protein synthesis, cell metabolism stops and lysis ensues. The RNA polymerase of Amanita phalloides is insensitive to the effects of amatoxins; thus, the mushroom does not poison itself.

Amatoxins are able to travel through the bloodstream to reach the organs in the body.  While these compounds can damage many organs, damage to the liver and heart result in fatalities.  At the molecular level, amatoxins cause damage to cells of these organs by causing perforations in the plasma membranes resulting in misplaced organelles that are normally in the cytoplasm to be found in the extracellular matrix.  beta-Amanitin is also an inhibitor of eukaryotic RNA polymerase II and RNA polymerase III, and as a result, mammalian protein synthesis. It has not been found to inhibit RNA polymerase I or bacterial RNA polymerase.  Because it inactivates the RNA polymerases, the liver is unable to repair the damage that beta-amanitin causes and the cells of the liver disintegrate and the liver dissolves.

Alpha-amanitin (α-Amanitin) primarily affects the bridge helix of the RNA pol II complex, a highly conserved domain 35 amino acids long. At the N-terminus and the C-terminus of this region there are hinge structures that undergo significant conformational changes throughout the nucleotide addition cycle, and are essential for its progression. One of the many roles of the bridge helix is facilitating the translocation of DNA.  Alpha-amanitin binds to the bridge helix of the RNA Pol II complex and it also binds to part of the complex that is adjacent to the bridge helix, while it is in one specific conformation.  This binding locks the bridge helix into place, dramatically slowing its movement in translocating the DNA. The rate of pol II translocation of DNA is reduced from several thousand to a few nucleotides per minute.

Symptoms of exposure
Upon exposure to amatoxins, the liver is the principal organ affected as it is the organ which is first encountered after absorption in the gastrointestinal tract. There is no evidence that amatoxins are absorbed through skin. One study done on mice shows that alpha-Amanitin is not absorbed through skin and therefore can not have any toxic effects. More specifically, exposure to amatoxins may cause irritation of the respiratory tract, headache, dizziness, nausea, shortness of breath, coughing, insomnia, diarrhea, gastrointestinal disturbances, back pain, urinary frequency, liver and kidney damage, or death if ingested or inhaled. For β-amanitin, there has been no full toxicological study. However, safety data sheets indicate that if it comes in contact with skin, it may cause irritation, burns, redness, severe pain, and could be absorbed through the skin, causing similar effects to exposure via inhalation and ingestion. Contact with the eyes may result in irritation, corneal burns, and eye damage.  Persons with pre-existing skin, eye, or central nervous systems disorders, impaired liver, kidney, or pulmonary function may be more susceptible to the effects of this substance.

Amatoxin poisoning shows a biphasic clinical pattern. An initial (12–24 hours) period of acute symptoms is followed by a period of relative wellness that lasts for 12–24 hours. After this period, liver and kidney failure supervene with death typically occurring from day 2 onwards.

The estimated minimum lethal dose is 0.1 mg/kg or 7 mg of toxin in adults. Their swift intestinal absorption coupled with their thermostability leads to rapid development of toxic effects in a relatively short period of time. The most severe effects are toxic hepatitis with centrolobular necrosis and hepatic steatosis, as well as acute tubulointerstitial nephropathy, which altogether induce severe liver failure and kidney failure.

Treatment
There are many anecdotal and partially-studied treatments in use worldwide. One study in mice showed null results for all studied treatments. Treatments showing no discernable value included N-acetylcysteine, benzylpenicillin, cimetidine, thioctic acid, and silybin.

Treatment involves high-dose penicillin as well as supportive care in cases of hepatic and renal injury. Silibinin, a product found in milk thistle, is a potential antidote to amatoxin poisoning, although more data needs to be collected. Cautious attention is given to maintaining hemodynamic stability, although if hepatorenal syndrome has developed the prognosis is guarded at best.

Detection
Presence of amatoxins in mushroom samples may be detected by the Meixner test (also known as the Wieland test). The amatoxins may be quantitated in plasma or urine using chromatographic techniques to confirm a diagnosis of poisoning in hospitalized patients and in postmortem tissues to aid in a medicolegal investigation of a suspected fatal overdosage.

In 2020, a monoclonal antibody-based lateral flow immunoassay has been developed that can quickly and selectively detect amatoxins. This test sensitively detects alpha-amanitin and gamma-amanitin (clearly detects 10 ng/mL), and exhibits slightly less detection for beta-amanitin (0.5% cross-reactivity; 2000 ng/mL). Although this test cross-reacts with phallotoxins at 0.005% (200,000 ng/mL), the phallotoxins would not interfere in urine sampling and there are very rare instances where a mushroom produces phallotoxins without producing amatoxins.

Mushroom species 
Amatoxin-containing mushroom species from the genera Amanita, Galerina and Lepiota.

See also 
 Phallotoxins, a closely related class of mycotoxins

References 

 
Hepatotoxins
Tryptamines
RNA polymerase inhibitors